Tony Farmer (born March 24, 1994) is an American professional basketball player who last played for the Halcones de Ciudad Obregón of the Circuito de Baloncesto de la Costa del Pacífico (CIBACOPA). A highly touted high school prospect, Farmer's career was brought to a halt when he was sentenced to three years in prison after pleading guilty to kidnapping charges in 2012. After his release in 2015, he played college basketball at Lee College and participated in the 2017 NBA draft, where he went undrafted.

Early life and education 
Farmer excelled at Garfield Heights High School outside of Cleveland, Ohio, graduating in 2012. He was rated among the top 100 high school players in the U.S. In his senior year, Farmer was being recruited by several Division I schools, including a handful in the Big Ten.

College career 
Farmer planned to enroll at Lincoln College, but was refused admission. He eventually signed to play with Lee College, a community college in Baytown, Texas. As a freshman in 2015–16, he made 31 appearances for the Runnin’ Rebels, averaging 16.7 points, 8.7 rebounds and 2.4 assists a contest. In 2016–17, Farmer scored 17.4 points per outing, while pulling down 9.5 rebounds and dishing out 3.2 assists a game.

After the conclusion of his sophomore year, Farmer turned pro and put his name in the 2017 NBA draft. He would ultimately be undrafted that year.

Professional career

Yakima SunKings (2018–2019) 
In the 2018 season, Farmer played two games for the Yakima SunKings of the NAPB.

Al Rayyan (2019–2020) 
Farmer signed with Al Rayyan of the Qatari Basketball League on November 12, 2019. He averaged 19.7 points, 10.9 rebounds and 3.1 assists per game in 16 games played.

Halcones de Ciudad Obregón (2020) 
In 2020, Farmer played two games with Mexican team Halcones de Ciudad Obregón of the Circuito de Baloncesto de la Costa del Pacífico (CIBACOPA) before the league was suspended due to the COVID-19 pandemic.

Pichincha de Potosí (2021) 
Farmer played with Bolivian team Pichincha de Potosí in 2021, leading them to an appearance in the league finals.

Riachuelo de La Rioja (2021) 
In September 2021, Farmer signed with Riachuelo de La Rioja in Argentina.

Return to Halcones de Ciudad Obregón (2022–present) 
Farmer returned to Halcones de Ciudad Obregón for the 2022 CIBACOPA season. He earned All-Star honors.

Legal issues 
In May 2012, Farmer was indicted by a grand jury charges of kidnapping, assault and robbery against his former girlfriend in Bedford Heights.

In August 2012, Farmer pled guilty to all three charges and was sentenced to three years imprisonment. In June 2015, he was released from prison.

In September 2020, police in Kenner, Louisiana, issued a warrant for Farmer's arrest on felony domestic abuse battery.

References

External links 
 Tony Farmer at RealGM

1994 births
Living people
American expatriate basketball people in Argentina
American expatriate basketball people in Bolivia
American expatriate basketball people in Mexico
American expatriate basketball people in Qatar
American men's basketball players
Basketball players from Cleveland
Halcones de Ciudad Obregón players
Junior college men's basketball players in the United States
Lee College (Texas) alumni
Small forwards